Jim Grabb and Jared Palmer were the defending champions but did not compete that year.

Marcos Ondruska and Grant Stafford won in the final 6–3, 6–2 against Noam Behr and Eyal Erlich.

Seeds

Draw

References
 1996 Eisenberg Israel Open Doubles Draw

Tel Aviv Open
1996 ATP Tour